George Olwande Odindo (born 12 October 1971) is a Kenyan boxer. He competed in the men's light heavyweight event at the 2000 Summer Olympics.

References

1971 births
Living people
Kenyan male boxers
Olympic boxers of Kenya
Boxers at the 2000 Summer Olympics
Place of birth missing (living people)
Light-heavyweight boxers